= Robert Wisdom (poet) =

English clergyman and poet (d. 1568)

Robert Wisdom (died 1568) was a Church of England priest and a minor poet.
